My American Wife is a 1936 American comedy film directed by Harold Young and written by Elmer Davis, Edith Fitzgerald and Virginia Van Upp. The film stars Francis Lederer, Ann Sothern, Fred Stone, Billie Burke, Ernest Cossart and Grant Mitchell. The film was released on August 7, 1936, by Paramount Pictures.

Plot

Cast 
Francis Lederer as Count Ferdinand von und zu Reidenach
Ann Sothern as Mary Cantillon
Fred Stone as Lafe Cantillon
Billie Burke as Mrs. Robert Cantillon
Ernest Cossart as Adolphe
Grant Mitchell as Robert Cantillon
Hal K. Dawson as Stephen Cantillon
Helene Millard as Mrs. Vincent Cantillon
Adrian Morris as Vincent Cantillon
Dora Clement as Agnes, Mrs. Stephen Cantillon
C. Montague Shaw as Butler

References

External links 
 

1936 films
American comedy films
1936 comedy films
Paramount Pictures films
American black-and-white films
Films directed by Harold Young (director)
1930s English-language films
1930s American films